Garbage theft may refer to:
Dumpster diving, the practice of sifting through trash to find discarded items that may be useful
Refund theft, a type of crime involving returning goods to a retailer in exchange for money or other goods
Garbage theft, the practice of sifting through people's trash on private property to profit from items that can be resold or traded for a cash refund and for the purposes of identity theft and fraud.